A virtual influencer, at times described as a virtual persona or virtual model, is a computer-generated fictional character that can be used for a variety of marketing-related purposes, but most frequently for social media marketing, in lieu of human "influencers". Most virtual influencers are designed using computer graphics and motion capture technology to resemble real people in realistic situations. Common derivatives of virtual influencers include VTubers, which broadly refer to online entertainers and YouTubers who represent themselves using virtual avatars instead of their physical selves.

History 
Virtual influencers are fundamentally synonymous with virtual idols, which originate from Japan's anime and Japanese idol culture that dates back to the 1980s. The first virtual idol created was Lynn Minmay, a fictional singer and main character of the anime television series Super Dimension Fortress Macross (1982) and the animated film adaptation Macross: Do You Remember Love? (1984). Minmay's success led to the production of more Japanese virtual idols, such as EVE from the Japanese cyberpunk anime Megazone 23 (1985), and Sharon Apple in Macross Plus (1994). Virtual idols were not always well received – in 1995, Japanese talent agency Horipro created Kyoko Date, which was inspired by the Macross franchise and dating sim games such as Tokimeki Memorial (1994). Date failed to gain commercial success despite drawing headlines for her debut as a CGI idol, largely due to technical limitations leading to issues such as unnatural movements, an issue also known as the uncanny valley.

Since their inception, many virtual idols created have achieved continual success, with notable names including the Vocaloid singer Hatsune Miku, and the virtual YouTuber Kizuna AI. Technological advancements have also enabled production teams to use artificial intelligence and advanced techniques to customize the personalities and behavior of virtual idols.

Benefits 
From a branding perspective, virtual influencers are much less likely to be mired in scandals. In China, celebrities caught in bad publicity such as singer Wang Leehom and entertainer Kris Wu have heightened the appeal of virtual influencers, since their existence relies entirely on computer-generated imagery, and hence are unlikely to cause any damage to a brand's image by association. Some studies have also suggested that Generation Z consumers have a unique appetite for virtual idols and influencers, since they grew up in the age of the internet. Studies also show that human-like appearance of virtual influencers show higher message credibility than anime-like virtual influencers.

Notable examples

Virtual bands 

 Gorillaz - A virtual band formed in 1998.
 K/DA - A virtual K-pop girl group created as part of the League of Legends video game franchise.
 MAVE: - a South Korean virtual girl group formed in 2023 by Metaverse Entertainment.
 Pentakill - A virtual heavy metal band created as part of the League of Legends video game franchise.
 Studio Killers - A Finnish-Danish-British virtual band formed in 2011.

Vocaloids 

 Hatsune Miku (modeled after Saki Fujita)
 Kagamine Rin/Len (modeled after Asami Shimoda)
 Megurine Luka (modeled after Yū Asakawa)
 Meiko (modeled after Meiko Haigō)
 Kaito (modeled after Naoto Fūga)

VTubers 

 Kano
 Kizuna AI
 Neuro-sama
 VShojo
 Ironmouse
 Projekt Melody
 Hololive
 Gawr Gura
 Hoshimachi Suisei
 Natsuiro Matsuri
 Aogiri Highschool
 Yamaguro Nekuro

Other examples 
 Ami Yamato
 Crazy Frog
 FN Meka
 IA
 Kuki AI
 Kyoko Date
 Kyra
 Miquela
 Shudu Gram

See also 
 Avatar (computing)
 CGI
 Content creation
 Internet celebrity
 Uncanny valley
 Virtual actor
 Virtual character
 Virtual humans

References 

 
 
Internet celebrities
Internet culture
Social media